Tanomah is a city in south-west Saudi Arabia, that has a population of 40,000. It is located at 120 km north of Abha. It is one of the most important resorts in Saudi Arabia. There are many waterfalls at the top of the mountain slopes. Mild to cold weather in most months of the year but very cold in winter. It has a concentration of natural forests, and is famous for abundant juniper pine trees. It is covered by fog almost year-round, which often makes the vision for a distance of 1 meter ahead not possible. There are a number of parks in Tanomah, including Alsharaf, Mnaa, Mahfar, Alerbuah, Trges, waterfalls Dahna, alhafer and Alehifah .

See also 

 List of cities and towns in Saudi Arabia
 Regions of Saudi Arabia

References 

Tanomah City

Populated places in 'Asir Province